Akbayır can refer to the following villages in Turkey:

 Akbayır, Cide
 Akbayır, Çubuk
 Akbayır, Hınıs
 Akbayır, Olur